Daniel Kraus is a New York Times bestselling American author known for his collaborations with George A. Romero and Guillermo del Toro.

Early life
Kraus was born June 7, 1975 in Midland, Michigan and grew up in Fairfield, Iowa.

Career
In 2009, Kraus published his first novel, The Monster Variations.  This book was included on the New York Public Library’s “100 Best Stuff for Teens” list in 2010.

His second novel, Rotters, was published in 2011, and won the 2012 Odyssey Award, the Parents' Choice Award Gold Award   and was a finalist for the Bram Stoker Award.  It was also chosen as Booklist Editors’ Choice for 2012 and was included on the Bulletin of the Center for Children’s Books Blue Ribbon List 2012.  It was produced as an audiobook, and was subsequently included on the American Library Association Amazing Audiobooks List 2012.

In 2013 Kraus published the novel Scowler through Delacorte Books. This book won a 2014 Odyssey award.

Trollhunters, published by Disney Hyperion in 2015, was co-authored with Guillermo del Toro, and adapted into the Netflix animated series of the same name.

In October 2015 Kraus published the first half of a two-part epic called The Death and Life of Zebulon Finch. Volume 1, At the Edge of Empire, was an Entertainment Weekly Best of 2015 title. Volume 2, Empire Decayed, released in October 2016.

Kraus also co-wrote the novelization of The Shape of Water with Guillermo del Toro, based on the popular film of the same name.

It was announced on February 14, 2018 that Kraus would complete the unfinished novel by George A Romero entitled The Living Dead. The book was released in August 2020.

Personal life
He lives in Chicago with his wife.

Bibliography

Standalone novels 
The Monster Variations (2009, Random House/Delacorte)
Rotters (2011, Random House/Delacorte)
Scowler (2013, Random House/Delacorte)
Blood Sugar (2019, Hard Case Crime)
Bent Heavens (2020, Macmillan)
Wrath, with Sharon Moalem (2022, Union Square & Co.)
Graveyard Girls: 1-2-3-4, I Declare a Thumb War, with Lisi Harrison (2022, Union Square & Co.)
The Ghost That Ate Us: The Tragic True Story of the Burger City Poltergeist (2022)

Film-maker collaborations 

 Trollhunters, with Guillermo del Toro (2015, Disney Hyperion)
 The Shape of Water, with Guillermo del Toro (2017, Feiwel & Friends)
 The Living Dead, with George A. Romero (2020, Macmillan)

The Death and Life of Zebulon Finch 
The Death and Life of Zebulon Finch, Volume 1: At the Edge of Empire (2015, Simon & Schuster)
The Death and Life of Zebulon Finch, Volume 2: Empire Decayed (2016, Simon & Schuster)

The Teddies Saga 
Illustrated by Rovina Cai
The Threw Us Away (2020, Holt)
They Stole Our Hearts (2021, Holt)

References

External links
Author website
Francis Ford Iowa
Work Series

Living people
American male novelists
21st-century American novelists
People from Midland,  Michigan
Novelists from Michigan
Novelists from Iowa
American young adult novelists
21st-century American male writers
1975 births